Biatoropsis is a genus of fungi belonging to the family Bulleraceae.

Species include:

Biatoropsis hafellneri
Biatoropsis millanesiana
Biatoropsis minuta
Biatoropsis protousneae
Biatoropsis usnearum

References

Tremellomycetes
Basidiomycota genera
Taxa named by Veli Räsänen
Taxa described in 1934